The Random House Tower, also known as the Park Imperial Apartments, is a 52-story mixed-use tower in Manhattan, New York City. It is owned by real estate companies SL Green Realty and Ivanhoé Cambridge, with the office portion leased as the headquarters to book publisher Random House from the beginning and its parent company Penguin Random House (formed in 2013) since 2016, giving the building its name; a luxury apartment complex follows above the offices. The PRH entrance is on Broadway and goes up to 27 floors, while the apartment complex entrance is on West 56th Street. Rising to 684 ft (208 m), it is the 77th tallest building in New York City.

Description 
The complex is on a trapezoidal block between 55th Street and 56th Street and follows the angle of Broadway. It has jagged setbacks to improve the views of Central Park.

The Random House Tower is divided into two parts: the office floors on the 2nd through 26th stories, and the residential floors between the 27th and 51st stories. The first floor contains  of retail space. Separate architects designed each of the sections. Skidmore, Owings & Merrill designed the office portion, which has a steel frame. Ismael Leyva Architects and Adam D. Tihany designed the residential portion, which has a concrete frame. The two sections do not entirely line up, and trusses were built on the 26th and 27th floor to transfer the load.

The residential section of the tower has 130 apartments. The residential floors are numbered 48-70 for marketing purposes. Among the first tenants were rapper P. Diddy and New York Yankees pitcher Randy Johnson.

The building has two fluid tuned mass dampers, which are designed to damp building sway. One tank runs west-east and the other runs north-south.

History
When the lease of its longtime headquarters at 201 East 50th Street was ending, Random House decided to expand its headquarters and move to a newly built tower. They originally planned in 1998 to build a tower at 45th and Broadway across from its parent company Bertelsmann's headquarters at 1540 Broadway with a neon-lighted skyway across 45th Street connecting them, but after long negotiations the owner of the property withdrew from the plans. Looking for an alternative, the company spoke with various developers, who were already planning apartment buildings, and in 1999 decided for the project of Stephen M. Ross at Broadway and 55th Street, which was already under construction. Subsequently, they assigned architects to develop a new design.

While the building has functioned as Random House's headquarters ever since, the 2013 newly formed Penguin Random House parent company initially worked from SoHo at 345 and 375 Hudson Street. In  2016, two years before the lease of the Random House Tower would end, the company extended the contract till 2033 and also moved to the tower of its subsidiary. There, Penguin Random House occupies  and employs 2,400 people.

Critical reception
Critics have noted that its three main towers give it the impression of being three books (although the architects referred to them as "three sliding crystals").

References

External links
Emporis profile
Park Imperial at CityRealty
Skyscaperpage.com profile
Wirednewyork profile
in-Arch.net: profile and information

Apartment buildings in New York City
Broadway (Manhattan)
Buildings and structures completed in 2003
Mass media company headquarters in the United States
Midtown Manhattan
Penguin Random House
Random House
Residential skyscrapers in Manhattan
Skidmore, Owings & Merrill buildings
Skyscraper office buildings in Manhattan
Residential buildings completed in 2003